Budd Lake is a lake in Martin County, in the U.S. state of Minnesota.

Budd Lake was named for William H. Budd, a local historian who settled there.

See also
List of lakes in Minnesota

References

Lakes of Minnesota
Lakes of Martin County, Minnesota